Arthur Stanley may refer to:
Arthur Stanley (politician) (1869–1947), British Conservative politician
Arthur Stanley, 5th Baron Stanley of Alderley (1875–1931), English nobleman and Governor of Victoria
Arthur Jehu Stanley Jr. (1901–2001), U.S. federal judge
Arthur J. Stanley (1853–1935), English footballer
Arthur Penrhyn Stanley (1815–1881), Dean of Westminster